Pari Gam Jagir, commonly known as Parigam Jagir, is a village in Pulwama district, Jammu & Kashmir, India.

Pari Gam Jagir village is located 8 km far from Pulwama district headquarter. According to the 2011 Census of India, the village has a total population of 4,530 people which includes 2,296 males and 2,234 females with an overall literacy rate of 51.17%.

References 

Villages in Pulwama district